Elihu Vedder (February 26, 1836January 29, 1923) was an American symbolist painter, book illustrator, and poet, born in New York City. He is best known for his fifty-five illustrations for Edward FitzGerald's translation of The Rubaiyat of Omar Khayyam (deluxe edition, published by Houghton Mifflin).

Biography

Elihu Vedder was born February 26, 1836, in New York City, the son of Dr. Elihu Vedder Sr. and Elizabeth Vedder.
His parents were cousins. His father, a dentist, decided to try his luck in Cuba, and this had a profound impact on Elihu Jr.'s childhood.
The remainder of his childhood was spent between his maternal grandfather Alexander Vedder's house in Schenectady and a boarding school. His mother supported his goals to be an artist while his father reluctantly assented, convinced that his son should try a different occupation. His brother, Dr. Alexander Madison Vedder, was a Navy surgeon who witnessed the transformation of Japan into a modern culture while he was stationed there.

Vedder trained in New York City with Tompkins H. Matteson, then in Paris with François-Édouard Picot. 
Finally, he completed his studies in Italy - where he was strongly influenced not only by Italian Renaissance work but also by the modern Macchiaioli painters and the living Italian landscape.
He first visited Italy from 1858 until 1860, becoming deeply emotionally attached to fellow painter Giovanni Costa. 
Their idyllic trips through the Italian countryside were cut short because Vedder's father cut off his financial allowance.

Penniless, Vedder returned to the United States during the American Civil War and made a small living undertaking commercial illustrations. He was involved in the bohemian 'Pfaff's' coffee house group and painted some of his most memorable paintings notable for their visionary nature, romantic imagery and often Oriental influences. Paintings of this time include 'The Roc's Egg', 'The Fisherman and the Genii' and one of his most famous works, 'Lair of the Sea Serpent.' In the United States, Vedder sought out and befriended Walt Whitman, Herman Melville and William Morris Hunt. Vedder became a member of the American Academy of Arts and Letters in 1865. At the end of the Civil War, Vedder left America to live in Italy.

He married Caroline Rosekrans on July 13, 1869, in Glen Falls, New York. 
Elihu Vedder and his wife had four children, only two of whom survived. His daughter Anita Herriman Vedder played a vital role in handling the business of her father, who was notorious for his general aloofness towards details. Elihu's son Enoch Rosekrans Vedder was a promising architect who married jewelry designer Angela Reston. Enoch died while visiting his parents in Italy on April 2, 1916. Elihu had a home in Rome and - after the financial success of his 1884 Rubaiyat work - on the Isle of Capri, then a haven for male aesthetes.

Vedder visited England many times, and was influenced by the Pre-Raphaelites, and was a friend of Simeon Solomon. He was also influenced by the work of English and Irish mystics such as William Blake and William Butler Yeats. In 1890 Vedder helped establish the In Arte Libertas group in Italy.

Tiffany commissioned him to design glassware, mosaics and statuettes for the company. He decorated the hallway of the Reading Room of the Washington Library of Congress, and his mural paintings can still be seen there.

Vedder occasionally returned to the United States, but lived only in Italy from 1906 until his death on January 29, 1923. He is buried in the Protestant Cemetery, Rome. There are no known living descendants of Elihu Vedder as both surviving children died without issue.

Exhibitions
In 2008, the Smithsonian American Art Museum organized an exhibition of Vedder's Rubaiyat illustrations that toured several museums, including the Phoenix Art Museum.

Gallery

References

Further reading

External links

 www.ElihuVedder.org 80 works online at Elihu Vedder virtual Gallery
 Artcyclopedia: Elihu Vedder Online
 Smithsonian Archives of American Art: The Elihu Vedder Papers

1836 births
1923 deaths
19th-century American painters
20th-century American painters
20th-century American male artists
American muralists
American male painters
Burials in the Protestant Cemetery, Rome
Orientalist painters
Painters from New York City
Symbolist painters
19th-century American male artists
Pre-Raphaelite painters
Pre-Raphaelite illustrators